Exidia glandulosa (common names black witches' butter, black jelly roll, or warty jelly fungus) is a jelly fungus in the family Auriculariaceae. It is a common, wood-rotting species in Europe, typically growing on dead attached branches of oak. Its occurrence elsewhere is uncertain because of confusion with the related species, Exidia nigricans.

Taxonomy
The species was originally described from France as Tremella glandulosa by Bulliard in 1789. It was subsequently placed in Exidia by Fries in 1822. Fries, however, modified Bulliard's species concept to include a second, effused, coalescing species—the name Exidia glandulosa serving for both. This combined concept was used until Neuhoff separated the two species in 1936. Unfortunately, Neuhoff gave the name Exidia glandulosa to the effused species, adopting the name Exidia truncata for Bulliard's original species. This error was pointed out by Donk in 1966, who proposed the name Exidia plana for the effused species, now replaced by Exidia nigricans.

Molecular research has shown that Exidia glandulosa and E. nigricans, though similar, are distinct.

The fungus is commonly known as "black witch's butter", "black jelly roll", or the "warty jelly fungus".

Description
They are firm when fresh, but become lax and distorted with age or in wet weather. The fruit bodies occur singly or in small clusters. The upper, spore-bearing surface is shiny and dotted with small pimples or pegs. The undersurface is smooth and matte at first, but develops a dense covering of small, gelatinous spines. The fruit bodies are attached to the wood at the base. The spore print is white. When the fruit bodies are dried they can shrink to form a flattened black crust.

Microscopic characters
The microscopic characters are typical of the genus Exidia. The basidia are ellipsoid, septate, 15–25 by 8–13 µm. The spores are allantoid (sausage-shaped), with dimensions of 14–19 by 4.5–5.5 µm.

Similar species

Exidia glandulosa is frequently confused with Exidia nigricans. The two are similar, but E. nigricans produces button-shaped fruit bodies in clusters that quickly become deformed and coalesce, forming an effused, lobed mass that can be  or more across. The two species are indistinguishable microscopically, but DNA research indicates they are distinct. The closely related E. recisa has more erect fruit bodies without warts on the surface, lighter colors (ranging from yellowish brown to dark brown), and a small base. E. nucleata is also similar.

The ascomycete Bulgaria inquinans forms similar, rubbery-gelatinous, blackish fruit bodies on oak. Their upper surfaces are entirely smooth, however, and they produce copious black (not white) spore prints, often leaving a black stain if wiped with the hand.

Habitat and distribution
Exidia glandulosa is a wood-rotting species, typically found on dead attached branches of broadleaf trees, especially oak, occasionally hazel or beech. It is a pioneer species capable of colonizing living or recently dead wood. A study of the wood decay process in attached oak branches showed that E. glandulosa is a member of a community of eight basidiomycetous fungi consistently associated with the decay of dying branches on living trees. Specifically, its role is to disintegrate the tissue of the vascular cambium, which loosens the attached bark. It persists for some while on fallen branches and logs. Fruit bodies are normally produced in the autumn and winter. Its global distribution is uncertain because of confusion with E. nigricans, but it is present in Europe at least.

Edibility
While nonpoisonous, one field guide says Exidia glandulosa is inedible, though it has also been reported to be edible.

References

External links
MushroomObserver Images

Auriculariales
Fungi of Europe